Sergii Kravchenko, (Ukrainian: Сергій Кравченко), is a Ukraine Paralympic sprinter who runs in the T37 class. Kravchenko qualified for the 2008 Paralympic Games but did not win a medal. He ran with the Ukraine team to win a gold medal and set a new championship record in the T35-38 4X100 m relay at the 2011 IPC Athletics World Championships.

References

Living people
Athletes (track and field) at the 2008 Summer Paralympics
Ukrainian male sprinters
Year of birth missing (living people)
21st-century Ukrainian people